John Arnold Logan (January 1, 1921 – September 16, 1977) was an American professional basketball player and coach born in Richmond, Indiana.  A 6'2" guard who played at Indiana University, Logan played for four seasons with the now-defunct St. Louis Bombers, and a fifth season with the Tri-Cities Blackhawks.  While with the Blackhawks, he served three games as an interim player-coach.

BAA/NBA career statistics

Regular season

Playoffs

References

External links
 BasketballReference.com: Johnny Logan (as player)
 BasketballReference.com: Johnny Logan (as coach)

1921 births
1977 deaths
American men's basketball coaches
American men's basketball players
Basketball coaches from Indiana
Basketball players from Indiana
Guards (basketball)
Indiana Hoosiers men's basketball players
Player-coaches
Sportspeople from Richmond, Indiana
St. Louis Bombers (NBA) players
Tri-Cities Blackhawks head coaches
Tri-Cities Blackhawks players